The Arabian sunbird (Cinnyris hellmayri) is a species of bird in the family Nectariniidae.

Subspecies
 Cinnyris hellmayri hellmayri Neumann
 Cinnyris hellmayri kinneari Bates

Distribution
It is found in Oman, Saudi Arabia, and Yemen.

Habitat
This species prefers rocky or sandy areas and dry river beds with Acacia and Ziziphus trees.

References

Arabian sunbird
Arabian sunbird
Arabian sunbird